Abenab is a settlement in the Otjozondjupa Region of central Namibia, situated  north of Grootfontein. It was founded in 1921 as a mining settlement for a nearby lead, vanadium and zinc mine. The mine closed down in 1958.

References

Populated places in the Otjozondjupa Region
Populated places established in 1921
1921 establishments in South West Africa
Mining in Namibia
Mining communities in Africa